Prusiana is an Indomalayan genus of grass skippers in the family Hesperiidae.

Species
Prusiana prusias  (Felder, 1861) 
P. p. prusias Sulawesi, Banggai, Sula Island, Salayar, Borneo
P. p. matinus  (Fruhstorfer, 1911)  Palawan, Philippines, Sangihe
Prusiana kuehni  (Plötz, 1886) 
P. k. kuehni Sulawesi, Banggai Island
P. k. insularis  (Elwes & Edwards, 1897)   Pulo Laut
Prusiana hercules  (Mabille, 1889)  Celebes

References
Natural History Museum Lepidoptera genus database
Prusiana Evans, 1937 at Markku Savela's Lepidoptera and Some Other Life Forms

Hesperiinae
Hesperiidae genera